Regio (pl. regiones) is the Latin word for ‘region’ and the Italian word for ‘royal’

It may refer to:

Regiopolis, a concept for urban centers in between metropolitan areas.

Ancient toponymy
Regiones of Augustan Italy, the departments in which Roman Emperor Augustus divided Italy.
14 regions of the Augustan Rome, in ancient Rome as a name for quartiers of the city of Rome
14 regions of Medieval Rome, resulting from the redivision of the Rome after the revolution of 1143
Regio, in ancient Constantinople as a name for the 14 quarters of the city of Constantinople, defined in analogy with those of Rome
Regio Aromatica, name for the Horn of Africa
Regiones, administrative subdivisions of the kingdoms of Anglo-Saxon England

Astronomy
Regio (astronomy), which, in planetary geology, is a large area of a planet or moon that is strongly differentiated in colour or albedo
A regio of Venus:
Alpha Regio
Asteria Regio
Beta Regio
Ovda Regio
A regio of Pluto:
Cthulhu Regio
Lowell Regio
Tombaugh Regio
A regio of Titan:
Tui Regio
A regio of Ganymede:
Galileo Regio
A regio on Phoebe:
Leto Regio
A regio on Iapetus:
Cassini Regio

See also

 Regio Ducal, a former opera house in Milan
 Teatro Regio (disambiguation), several theaters in Italy
 Regio Esercito, the army of the Kingdom of Italy
 Regia Marina, the navy of the Kingdom of Italy
 Regio Esercito (World War II)
 The Stadler Regio-Shuttle, a German diesel railcar
 Regio Trans, a Romanian railway company
 Regio (Swiss railway train), a category of train service in Switzerland